This is a complete list of Disney comics by Don Rosa. It is sorted in chronological order after the date of first publication.

List

Original

Sequels to Barks' stories

Continuity between Don Rosa's stories 
These are Don Rosa's sequels to his own stories.

 See The Life and Times of Scrooge McDuck for a serial of comic book stories that chronicle the in-universe biography of Scrooge McDuck.
 "A Matter of Some Gravity", "Forget It!"
 "The Three Caballeros Ride Again", "The Magnificent Seven (Minus 4) Caballeros"
 "The Universal Solvent", "The Black Knight", "The Black Knight Glorps Again!"

Collections 
The Don Rosa Library of Uncle Scrooge Adventures in Color Vols. 1–8
The Life and Times of Scrooge McDuck
The Life and Times of Scrooge McDuck Companion
The Barks/Rosa Collection Vols. 1–3
Walt Disney Treasury: Donald Duck Vols. 1, 2
The Don Rosa Library

See also
 Donald Duck in comics / Donald Duck universe
 Disney comics / Inducks (database) / Donaldism (fandom)
 List of Disney comics by Carl Barks

References

External links
Index on INDUCKS
Index on The D.U.C.K.man
Index on DuckMania

 
Comics by Don Rosa
Rosa, Don
Disney
Disney comics